Pomegranate soup ( āš e anār; , ; Mazandarani: اسپاش انار او, aspāsh enār oo;  shorbat rummān) is an Iranian dish made from pomegranate juice and seeds, yellow split peas, mint leaves, spices, and other ingredients. It is regarded as an āsh, which is the Iranian term for a "thick soup".

See also
Āsh, a genre of soup in Iran
 List of soups

References

External links
Ash-e anar recipe

Fruit soups
Turkish soups
Azerbaijani soups
Pomegranates
Vegetarian dishes of Iran
Iranian soups